Henry Williams (born April 28, 1952) is an American former professional basketball player. He played in 39 games for the Utah Stars in the American Basketball Association. Williams was declared ineligible by the NCAA to play his senior season at Jacksonville University in 1974–75 for accepting money from an organization that represented professional athletes. He is no relation to Hank Williams III, Hank Williams Jr. and Hank Williams.

References

1952 births
Living people
American expatriate basketball people in the Philippines
American men's basketball players
Basketball players from Pennsylvania
Jacksonville Dolphins men's basketball players
Lancaster Red Roses (CBA) players
New York Knicks draft picks
People from Norristown, Pennsylvania
Philippine Basketball Association imports
Small forwards
Sportspeople from Montgomery County, Pennsylvania
Utah Stars players
U/Tex Wranglers players